Love Express is a 2011 Hindi romantic comedy film directed by Sunny Bhambani and produced by Subhash Ghai. The film is set to release under the Mukta Arts banner. Shooting of the film began on 18 July 2010.

Plot
Love Express tells the story of two Punjabi families who have known each other for 30 years and are trying to have wedding during a train journey. When the bride and groom don't like each other and secretly plan to cancel the wedding, the two families call off the wedding. The fun begins when the bride and groom start liking each other and fall in love. Will they get together or will 30 years of friendship be destroyed by these chain of events?

Cast
Sahil Mehta
Mannat Ravi (Neha Yadav)
Vikas Katyal
Priyum Galav
Om Puri
Taran Bajaj as Balli

Reception 
A critic from The Times of India wrote that "Most of the stories have no substance". A critic from Koimoi opined that "On the whole, Love Express does not entertain at all because as a film, it fails to express anything". On the contrary, a critic from Behindwoods wrote that "For the first film made by students of film direction and acting, this is a laudable effort which hopefully will only get better".

References

External links
 
 Love Express Cast and Crew Details - IndiaFM

2010s Hindi-language films
2011 films
2011 romantic comedy films
Indian romantic comedy films